Bychikha is a rural locality (a village) in Kharovskoye Rural Settlement, Kharovsky District, Vologda Oblast, Russia. The population was 10 as of 2002.

Geography 
Bychikha is located 16 km northwest of Kharovsk (the district's administrative centre) by road. Yekimovskaya is the nearest rural locality.

References 

Rural localities in Kharovsky District